Elegant Slumming is the second album by the British dance band M People. It was released on 4 October 1993 charting and peaking at number 2 on the UK Album Chart and spent 87 weeks in the Top 75. It re-entered the chart three times in October 1996 and March and September 1997. Its overall sales stand at 759,000 as of September 2020.

The four singles released from the album were all UK Top 10 hits: "One Night in Heaven" (#6) and "Moving on Up" (#2), as well as a cover version of the Dennis Edwards and Siedah Garrett song "Don't Look Any Further", which reached No. 9 in the UK. A fourth hit, "Renaissance", reached No. 5 in the same chart.

The US version was released in 1994 in a separate deal on the Epic label, and replaces 3 tracks with 3 hits from their debut album Northern Soul, which did not have a US release. The album was well received, and "One Night in Heaven" and "Moving on Up" were Billboard No. 1 hits on Hot Dance Club Play.

The original British album won the 1994 UK Mercury Music Prize.

Track listing
All songs written by Mike Pickering and Paul Heard except where noted.

US CD & European cassette version

Note
The U.S. vinyl edition contains eight tracks, omitting Little Packet & Love is in My Soul. In addition to this, Colour My Life is placed as track eight.

Charts

Weekly charts

Year-end charts

Certifications

References

1993 albums
M People albums
Mercury Prize-winning albums